El Aouana is a district in Jijel Province, Algeria. It was named after its capital, El Aouana.

Municipalities
The district is further divided into 2 municipalities:
El Aouana
Selma Benziada